Election Day was held on September 10, 2017. 82 out of 85 of Russia's regions took part in the voting. Only in Saint Petersburg, Republic of Ingushetia and Magadan Oblast no elections took place.

Overview

Elections to the State Duma 
2017 Bryansk by-election in the Bryansk Oblast
2017 Kingisepp by-election in the Leningrad Oblast

Mayoral elections 

Yakutsk

Regional legislative elections 

Krasnodar Krai
North Ossetia–Alania
Penza Oblast
Sakhalin Oblast
Saratov Oblast
Udmurtia

Gubernatorial elections 

Sixteen federal subjects will have direct elections of governors, and in Adygeya, the governor will be elected by the local parliament.

Adygea
Belgorod Oblast
Kaliningrad Oblast
Kirov Oblast
Mari El Republic
Novgorod Oblast
Perm Krai
Republic of Buryatia
Republic of Karelia
Republic of Mordovia
Ryazan Oblast
Saratov Oblast
Sevastopol1
Sverdlovsk Oblast
Tomsk Oblast
Udmurt Republic
Yaroslavl Oblast

1 Internationally recognised as part of Ukraine, see political status of Crimea and 2014 Crimean crisis for details

Representative bodies 

2017 Moscow municipal election

References

External links 
 Website of the Central Election Commission of the Russian Federation

Regional elections in Russia
September 2017 events in Russia